Maureen Fitzgerald Terry is an American restaurant owner and politician from Maine. A Democrat from Gorham, Maine, she has been the Majority Leader of the Maine House of Representatives since December 7, 2022.

References 

21st-century American politicians
21st-century American women politicians
Democratic Party members of the Maine House of Representatives
Living people
Majority leaders of the Maine House of Representatives
Place of birth missing (living people)
Women state legislators in Maine
Year of birth missing (living people)